Edwin B. Pinkham (August 1846 – December 19, 1906) was a professional baseball player. He played one season of Major League Baseball as an infielder in 1871 for the Chicago White Stockings.

Pinkham grew up in Williamsburg, Brooklyn and enlisted as a teenager in the 47th New York Volunteer Infantry on May 27, 1862. After playing for the White Stockings, Pinkham returned to New York to raise beets.

References

External links

1846 births
1906 deaths
19th-century baseball players
Major League Baseball infielders
Brooklyn Eckfords (NABBP) players
Brooklyn Enterprise players
Chicago White Stockings (NABBP) players
Chicago White Stockings players
Sportspeople from Brooklyn
Baseball players from New York City
Union Army soldiers
Burials at Cypress Hills Cemetery